The Malta declaration is the statement of the Third International Intersex Forum, which took place in Valletta, Malta, in 2013. The event was supported by the ILGA and ILGA-Europe and brought together 34 people representing 30 organisations from multiple regions of the world.

The declaration affirmed the existence of intersex people, and demanded an end to "discrimination against intersex people and to ensure the right of bodily integrity, physical autonomy and self-determination". For the first time, participants made a statement on birth registrations, in addition to other human rights issues:

The declaration 

The forum called on:

Signatories 

The Forum was organized by ILGA Europe's Silvan Agius and Ruth Baldacchino, and three intersex activists selected from an open call application process managed by ILGA Europe: Mauro Cabral, of Argentina, Mani Bruce Mitchell, of New Zealand, and Hida Viloria of Intersex Campaign for Equality. Attending participants included Sean Saifa Wall and Pidgeon Pagonis for AIC (now interACT), Morgan Carpenter and Tony Briffa from Organisation Intersex International Australia, Intersex Austria Holly Greenberry from Intersex UK, Miriam van der Have and Inge Intven of Nederlandse Netwerk Intersekse/DSD (NNID), and representatives of Zwischengeschlecht, and IVIM/OII Deutschland

Adoption and legacy 

The declaration has been cited by numerous human rights institutions around the world, including intersex human rights papers published by the Council of Europe's Commissioner for Human Rights, and the Asia Pacific Forum of National Human Rights Institutions, and by organizations allying themselves with the intersex human rights movement.

In 2015, Malta adopted world-first legislation to protect intersex infants and children from non-consensual medical interventions.

In March 2017, the Malta declaration was acknowledged by a consensus "Darlington Statement", published by Australian and New Zealand intersex community organizations and others. The statement calls for legal reform, including the criminalization of deferrable intersex medical interventions on children, an end to legal classification of sex, and improved access to peer support.

See also
 Intersex human rights
 Intersex rights in Malta
 Intersex civil society organizations

References

Events about intersex
Intersex rights
Intersex rights in Malta
2013 in Malta